Thiaw is a Senegalese and Gambian surname common among the Serer people of West Africa. Notable people with the surname include:

 Issa Laye Thiaw (Professor Issa Laye Thiaw is a Serer historian, theologian on Serer religion and author)
 Pape Thiaw (Footballer from Senegal)

References

Serer surnames